The population of Gujarat in 2011 Census of India was 60,439,692 Of this 8,917,174 persons belong to one of the Scheduled Tribes (STs) constituting 14.75 per cent of the total population of the state. The state has registered 21.4 per cent decadal growth in the Scheduled Tribe population between 1991-2001.

List of communities 
There are thirty one (31) notified Scheduled Tribes in the state, which are as follows:

1 Rot
2 Balat
4 Bhil, Bhil Taviyad, Bhil Garasia, Dholi Bhil, Dungri Bhil, Dungri Garasia, Mewasi Bhil,Malivad bhil, Rawal Bhil, Tadvi Bhil, Bhagalia, Bhilala, Pawra, Valvi, Vasava, Vasave,Katara,Bhabhor
6 Chaudhari (in Surat, Tapi and Valsad districts)
7 Chodhara
8 Dhanka, Tadvi, Tetaria, 
9 Dhodia, Dhodi
10 Rathod, Talavia, Halpati
11 Gamit, Gamta, Valvi, Gavit Mavchi, Padvi
12 Gond, Rajgond
13 Kathodi, Katkari, Dhor Kathodi, Dhor Katkari, Son Kathodi, Son Katkari
14 Kokna, Kokni, Kukna
15 Omit
16 Koli Dhor, Tokre Koli, Kolcha, Kongha
17 Kunbi (in the Dang Districts
18 Naikda, Nayaka, Patel Nayka, Cholivala Nayaka, Kapadia Nayaka, Mota Nayaka, Nana Nayaka
19 Padhar
20 Omit
21 Pardhi, Advichincher, Phanse Pardhi (excluding Amreli, Bhavanagar, Jamnagar, Jungadh, Kutch, Rajkot and Surrendranagar district)
22 Pateliya
23 Pomla
25 Rathwa, Rathva, Rathva koli
26 Siddi, Siddi-Badshan, Siddi - Habshi (in Amreli, Bhavnagar, Jamnagar, Junagadh, Rajkot and Surendranagar Districts)
27 Omit
28 Varli
29 Vitolia, Kotwalia, Barodia
30 Bhil Pargi (Panchmahl Morva Hadf)
31 Rabari,Charan and Bharwad iIn the nassis of Gir, Barda and Aalech)

Population in 2011

Scheduled areas 
The following are the scheduled areas of Gujarat:

1. Uchchhal, Vyara, Nizar, Songadh, Valod,  talukas in Tapi district

2. Dediapada, Sagbara, Valia, Nandod and Jhagadia talukas in Bharuch district

3. Dangs district and taluka

4. Vansda, Dharampur, Chikhali, Pardi, Kaprada and Umbergaon talukas in Valsad district

5. Jhalod, Dohad, Santrampur, Limkheda and Deogarh Baria, Morva (Hadaf), Pratapgad (Khedapa) talukas in Panchmahal district

6. Chhotaudepur, kavant, jetpur-Pavi, sankheda, Bodeli and Naswadi talukas and Tilakwada  in Vadodara district [ Chhotaudepur district ]

7. Gir, Barda & Alech Nesses Area in Saurashtra (region)

8. Khedbrahma, Bhiloda and Meghraj talukas and Vijayanagar mahal in Sabarkantha district

9. Mahuwa, Mandvi, Mangrol,Umarpada and Bardoli taluka in Surat District

The Scheduled Areas in the States of Bihar and Gujarat were originally specified by the Scheduled Areas (Part A States) Order, 1950 (Constitution Order, 9) dated 23.1.1950 and have been respecified as above by the Scheduled Areas (States of Bihar, Gujarat, Madhya Pradesh and Orissa) Order, 1977 (Constitution Order, 109) dated 31.12.1977 after rescinding the Order cited first so far as that related to the States of Bihar & Gujarat.

References